Sandy Bull & The Rhythm Ace Live 1976 is a live album by folk guitarist Sandy Bull, released in 2012 through Drag City. It contains Bull's performance at the Berkeley Community Theatre on May 2, 1976. Many of the pieces performed were never recorded for his albums, making their debut appearance on this release.

Track listing

Personnel 
Sandy Bull – acoustic guitar, electric guitar, bass guitar, oud, steel guitar, vocals
Eric Jacobs – mastering
Hillel Resner – recording
The Rhythm Ace – drum machine
Lewis Watts – photography
Baron Wolman – photography

References 

2012 live albums
Drag City (record label) albums
Sandy Bull albums